Isaac de Vega (7 November 1920 – 3 February 2014) was a Spanish Canarian writer.  He received the Premio Canarias de Literatura in 1988 along with Rafael Arozarena.

De Vega was born in Granadilla de Abona, Tenerife, Canary Islands and studied at the University of La Laguna. He formed a part of the fetasiano group with other Canarian writers including Rafael Arozarena and José Antonio Padrón.

His daughter María Teresa de Vega is a writer and poet.

Literature
He wrote several works including:

Antes del amanecer (1956)
Fetasa (1957)
Cuatro relatos (1968)
Parhelios (1977)
Pulsatia (1988)
Conjuro en Ijuana (1981)

References

1920 births
2014 deaths
People from Tenerife
Spanish male writers
Writers from the Canary Islands